Wu Ta-You (27 September 1907 – 4 March 2000) was a Chinese physicist and writer who worked in the United States, Canada, mainland China and Taiwan. He has been called the Father of Chinese Physics.

Early life and education 
Wu was born in Panyu, Guangzhou (Canton) in the last years of the Qing dynasty. In 1929 he took his undergraduate degree at Nankai University in Tianjin (Tientsin). He moved to the United States for graduate schooling and obtained a Doctor of Philosophy Degree from the University of Michigan in 1933.

Career 
Wu returned to China (then Republic of China) after receiving his doctorate degree, and between 1934 and 1949 he taught at various institutions there, including Peking University in Beijing, and National Southwestern Associated University in Kunming. In 1949, the year of the defeat of the Nationalists by the Communists in the Chinese Civil War, Wu moved to Canada.

There he headed the Theoretical Physics Division of the National Research Council until 1963. In the 1960s, he was Chair of the Department of Physics and Astronomy at the University at Buffalo. After 1962, he held various positions in Taiwan (Republic of China), including the President of the Academia Sinica (1983–1994). He continued lecturing into his 90s and died on March 4, 2000.

Wu's PhD dissertation dealt with theoretical predictions of the chemical properties of the yet undiscovered transuranic elements of the actinide series, which includes such well known elements as plutonium and americium. Later in his career, he worked on solid-state physics, molecular physics, statistical physics and other areas of theoretical physics.  He was known as a teacher as much as a theoretician. His many illustrious students include Chen Ning Yang and Tsung-Dao Lee, co-winners of the Nobel Prize in Physics in 1957.

Wu wrote several books, best known of which are the monograph Vibrational Spectra and Structure of Polyatomic Molecules (1939) and the graduate level textbooks Quantum Mechanics (1986) and (as co-author) Relativistic Quantum Mechanics and Quantum Fields (1991).

Awards and honors 
 Beginning from 2002, National Science Council of Republic of China (reformed as the Ministry of Science and Technology since 2014) gives out Wu Ta-You Memorial Award every year.
 The Department of Physics of the University of Michigan hosts Ta-You Wu Lecture. 
 Asteroid 256892 Wutayou, discovered by astronomers Chi Sheng Lin and Ye Quanzhi in 2008, was named in his memory. The official  was published by the Minor Planet Center on 17 May 2011.

References

External links 
 A Biographical Sketch of Dr. Ta-You Wu – Lee, Ting-Kuo (2007). AAPPS Bulletin 17, 5.
 A Chronology of Ta-You Wu's Life and Career, Hsu, Jong-Ping and Leonardo (1998). JingShin Theoretical Physics Symposium in Honor of Professor Ta-You Wu. World Scientific Publishing.

1907 births
2000 deaths
20th-century Taiwanese writers
Chinese Civil War refugees
Chinese expatriates in Canada
Chinese expatriates in the United States
Chinese nuclear physicists
Educators from Guangdong
Members of Academia Sinica
Ministers of Science and Technology of the Republic of China
Tianjin Nankai High School alumni
Nankai University alumni
Academic staff of the National Southwestern Associated University
Academic staff of Peking University
People from Panyu District
Physicists from Guangdong
Polytechnic Institute of New York University faculty
Recipients of the Order of Brilliant Star
Republic of China science writers
Academic staff of Sichuan University
Taiwanese expatriates in the United States
Taiwanese male writers
Taiwanese people from Guangdong
20th-century Taiwanese physicists
University at Buffalo faculty
University of Michigan alumni
Writers from Guangzhou